Raymond Richez was a French sprint canoer who competed in the late 1940s. He was eliminated in the heats of the K-2 1000 m event at the 1948 Summer Olympics in London.

References
René Richez's profile at Sports Reference.com

External links
 

Canoeists at the 1948 Summer Olympics
French male canoeists
Olympic canoeists of France
Year of birth missing
Possibly living people